Dead Expensive is a 2021 Nigeria comedic movie produced by Isioma Muller and directed by Aniedi Awah Noba  The movie that challenges the archaic practices of the  Africans on celebrating the dead over the living stars Sola Sobowale, Charles Inojie and Ime Bishop

Synopsis 
After the demise of a rich man, the children had to battle with the family who is hiding behind African customary and traditional way of sharing property and caring for the dead that makes life unbearable for the living.

Premiere 
The movie was first premiered at the Oriental hotel, Lagos on Sunday, May 9, 2021 before it was released to cinemas nationwide on May 14. The premiering was witnessed by celebrities such as Bishop (Okon Lagos), Melvin Oduah, Bolaji Ogunmola, Bryan Okwara, Mawuli Gavor, Djinee and Juliet Ibrahim

Cast 

 Sola Sobowale,
 Charles Inojie,
 Ime Bishop (Okon Lagos),
 Melvin Oduah,
 Bolaji Ogunmola,
 Charles Maduka,
 Frank John and

References 

2021 films
Nigerian comedy films
English-language Nigerian films